The Goldwater Women's Tennis Classic was a tournament for professional female tennis players played on outdoor hardcourts. It was classified as a $75,000 ITF Women's Circuit event, and was held annually in Phoenix, Arizona, from 2009 to 2012.

Past finals

Singles

Doubles

External links 
 ITF search
 

ITF Women's World Tennis Tour
Hard court tennis tournaments
Defunct tennis tournaments in the United States
Recurring sporting events established in 2009
Recurring sporting events disestablished in 2012
Tennis tournaments in Arizona